Dystopia is a compilation album consisting of earlier albums, Spanking Machine, To Mother, and the Handsome & Gretel single recorded by Babes in Toyland. It was released in 1994 by Insipid Records.

Track listing 
All song by Babes in Toyland
"Swamp Pussy" - 2:24
"He's My Thing" - 2:56
"Vomit Heart" - 2:49
"Never" - 3:16
"Boto (W) Rap" - 2:31
"Dogg" - 3:53
"Pain in my Heart" - 3:59
"Lashes" - 3:46
"You're Right" - 3:07
"Dust Cake Boy"* - 3:31
"Fork Down Throat" - 3:54
"Catatonic"* - 2:50
"Mad Pilot" - 2:51
"Primus" - 4:00
"Laugh My Head Off" - 3:34
"Spit to See the Shine" - 2:45
"Ripe" - 3:39
"Quiet Room" - 2:38
"Handsome and Gretel"* – 2:01
"Pearl" – 1:56

Personnel
Kat Bjelland - Guitar, vocals
Lori Barbero - drums, vocals on "Dogg" and "Primus"
Michelle Leon - Bass on tracks 1-18
Maureen Herman - Bass on tracks 19 and 20

References

Babes in Toyland (band) compilation albums
1994 compilation albums
Albums produced by Jack Endino